Cui Wenhua (崔 文華, born ) is a Chinese male weightlifter, competing in the 105 kg category and representing China at international competitions. He participated at the 1996 Summer Olympics in the 108 kg event. He competed at world championships, most recently at the 1998 World Weightlifting Championships.

He set an Asian record in the Snatch 14 November 1998 of 195 kg and a month later he set Asian Games records in the Snatch also of 195 kg and a total score record of 410.0 kg.

Major results
 - 1995 World Championships Heavyweight class (407.5 kg)
 - 1997 World Championships Heavyweight class (415.0 kg)
 - 1994 Asian Games Heavyweight class
 - 1998 Asian Games Heavyweight class
 - 2002 Asian Games Heavyweight class

References

External links
 

1974 births
Living people
Chinese male weightlifters
Weightlifters at the 1996 Summer Olympics
Olympic weightlifters of China
Place of birth missing (living people)
World Weightlifting Championships medalists
Weightlifters at the 1994 Asian Games
Weightlifters at the 1998 Asian Games
Weightlifters at the 2002 Asian Games
Asian Games gold medalists for China
Asian Games silver medalists for China
Asian Games medalists in weightlifting
Medalists at the 1994 Asian Games
Medalists at the 1998 Asian Games
Medalists at the 2002 Asian Games
20th-century Chinese people